Talal Nayef (born 10 November 1985) is a Kuwaiti footballer currently playing with Al Arabi.

He formerly played for the u-19 team in Kuwait, and then selected to play for the national team.

External links
 Player profile at goalzz.com
 

1985 births
Living people
Kuwaiti footballers
Al-Arabi SC (Kuwait) players
Qatar SC players
Sportspeople from Kuwait City
Kuwait international footballers
Association football midfielders
Footballers at the 2006 Asian Games
Asian Games competitors for Kuwait
Al-Nasr SC (Kuwait) players
Al-Sulaibikhat SC players
Suwaiq Club players
Kuwait Premier League players
Oman Professional League players
Expatriate footballers in Oman
Expatriate footballers in Bosnia and Herzegovina
Kuwaiti expatriate footballers
Kuwaiti expatriate sportspeople in Oman
Kuwaiti expatriate sportspeople in Bosnia and Herzegovina
Kuwaiti expatriate sportspeople in Qatar
Expatriate footballers in Qatar
Qatari Second Division players